The New South Wales Department of Primary Industries (DPI) is an agency of the New South Wales Government, responsible for the administration and development for agriculture, fisheries, aquaculture, forestry, and biosecurity in New South Wales. The DPI works to drive innovation in primary industries to improve resilience, productivity and sustainability, and to ensure risks are managed for natural resources, farming and food.

Despite the name, the DPI is no longer and is not a department of the New South Wales government. The DPI is part of the Department of Regional NSW, and was previously part of the Department of Planning, Industry and Environment until April 2020.

The DPI headquarters is located in Orange.

Structure

Leadership
The DPI is led by its director-general, currently Scott Hansen, who reports to the Minister for Agriculture and Western New South Wales, presently the Honourable Adam Marshall .

The DPI sits within the wider portfolio of the Department of Regional NSW, led by its secretary, currently Gary Barnes.

Divisions
, the DPI consists of the following divisions:
DPI Agriculture
DPI Biosecurity and Food Security
DPI Fisheries
DPI Investment and Business Development
DPI Engagement and Industry Assistance
DPI Research Excellence

Legislation
The DPIs powers are principally drawn from a range of legislation including the Biosecurity Act (2015) (NSW), Agricultural Industry Services Act (1998), Biological Control Act (1985), Forestry Act (1916), and Fisheries Management Act (1994), Fisheries Act (1935) plus over sixty other acts.

History
The first predecessor of the Department of Primary Industries was the Department of Mines and Agriculture, established on 3 November 1890.

The first Department of Primary Industries was formed as a government department on 1 July 2004, with the amalgamation of the Department of Agriculture, Department of Mineral Resources, NSW Fisheries,  Forestry Commission and State Forests. Barry Buffier was the inaugural director-general of the department. In 2009, it was abolished and amalgamated into the Department of Industry and Investment.

On 4 April 2011, the Department of Primary Industries was re-established as a Division of the Government Service following the 2011 state election. Three months later, on 1 July 2011, the Department of Primary Services ceased to be a Division of the Government Service and became a departmental office under the Department of Trade and Investment, Regional Infrastructure, which later became Department of Industry. The Department of Industry became the Department of Planning, Industry and Environment (DPIE) in 2019.

On 2 April 2020, the Department of Regional NSW was established and the Department of Primary Industries became part of the new department.

On 3 November 2020, the DPI celebrated 130 years of its founding. On the same day, it moved its Orange office.

Headquarters
In 1992, the DPI headquarters moved from Sydney to 161 Kite Street, Orange by the NSW Minister for Agriculture and Rural Affairs Ian Armstrong, as part of the state government's decentralisation plan. Armstrong would later be the Deputy Premier of New South Wales from 1993 to 1995.

On 3 November 2020, the DPI headquarters moved to the newly opened Ian Armstrong Building, named after Armstrong, located on 105 Prince Street, Orange at the site of the former Orange Base Hospital. The building also houses offices of the Departments of Planning, Industry and Environment (DPIE), Regional NSW, Premier and Cabinet, and Education.

See also 
 Department of Agriculture (Australia)
 Department of Agriculture, Fisheries and Forestry (Australia)

References

External links
NSW Department of Primary Industries website

Agricultural organisations based in Australia
New South Wales
Forestry agencies in Australia
Economy of New South Wales
2011 establishments in Australia
Government agencies established in 2011